William Keough may refer to:
 William Keough (politician) (1913–1971), politician in Newfoundland, Canada
 William F. Keough Jr., American hostage in the Iran hostage crisis
 Ty Keough (born 1956), American soccer player and coach, sports broadcaster